Christos Intzidis (born 9 January 1993) is a Greek professional footballer who plays as a centre back for Malaysia Premier League club Kelantan.

Career

Youth career
Intzidis started his youth career at Ilioupoli. At the age of 8 he moved to the youth academy of Greek powerhouse club, PAOK.

PAOK
In August 2012, Intzidis signed his first professional contract with the club. The same month, on 9 August 2012, he made his first-team debut against Bnei Yehuda in the UEFA Europa League, replacing Giorgos Katsikas. Despite not starting for PAOK's first-team, the club rated him highly and sent him on loan twice, both to rival Super League 1 teams, to support his development in other strong environments. Christos was a starter at both clubs, Platanias and Levadiakos. He spent a total of 12 years at PAOK before leaving the club at the conclusion of the 2014-15 season, with three years spent as a first-team player.

Aris
On 20 October 2015 he joined Aris Thessaloniki. On 22 July 2016 he signed a 2-year contract extension. On 29 March 2017 the club's administration decided to terminate his contract.

Honours
Aris Thessaloniki
Gamma Ethniki: 2015–16

References

8. https://www.vocketfc.com/christos-intzidis-dari-greece-akan-tiba-minggu-hadapan-zamsaham-sasar-kelantan-fc-ke-liga-super-2024/

External links
PAOK FC official website

Onsports.gr

1993 births
Living people
Greek footballers
Greek expatriate footballers
Association football defenders
Super League Greece players
Cypriot First Division players
A Lyga players
Liga II players
PAOK FC players
Platanias F.C. players
Levadiakos F.C. players
Apollon Limassol FC players
Olympiacos Volos F.C. players
Panachaiki F.C. players
Aris Thessaloniki F.C. players
Panegialios F.C. players
South Melbourne FC players
FK Palanga players
FK Csíkszereda Miercurea Ciuc players
CS Concordia Chiajna players
Expatriate footballers in Cyprus
Expatriate soccer players in Australia
Expatriate footballers in Lithuania
Expatriate footballers in Romania
Footballers from Thessaloniki